USS Eastern Chief (ID-3390) was a United States Navy cargo ship in commission from 1918 to 1919.

Construction, acquisition, and commissioning
Eastern Chief was built as the commercial cargo ship SS Yoshida Maru No. 3 and completed in December 1917 by the Uraga Dock Company in Uraga, Japan. Soon after completion she was sent to the United States, where she was placed under the control of the United States Shipping Board, which renamed her SS Eastern Chief.  On 10 September 1918, the U.S. Navys 6th Naval District inspected her at Charleston, South Carolina, for possible naval service during World War I, and the Shipping Board transferred her to the Navy on 25 September 1918 at the Charleston Navy Yard in Charleston. The Navy assigned her the naval registry identification number 3390 and commissioned her on 27 September 1918 as USS Eastern Chief (ID-3390).

Operational history
Assigned to the Naval Overseas Transportation Service, Eastern Chief departed Hampton Roads, Virginia, on 9 October 1918. After stopping at Sydney, Nova Scotia, Canada, for repairs, she arrived at La Pallice, France, on 26 November 1918 to discharge her cargo and load ordnance and engineering stores. She departed La Pallice on 14 December 1918 and arrived at Norfolk, Virginia, on 8 January 1919.

On 9 February 1919, Eastern Chief was again underway for La Pallice. During her transatlantic crossing, she went to the aid of the disabled U.S. Navy cargo ship  on 15 February 1919, standing by West Haven until a tug came to assist. Eastern Chief helped tow West Haven to Bermuda, then resumed course for La Pallice, which she finally reached on 23 February 1919. She then steamed to Antwerp, Belgium, where she finished offloading her cargo. She departed Antwerp on 3 May 1919 bound for Norfolk, where she arrived on 23 May 1919.

Decommissioning and disposal
Eastern Chief was decommissioned on 29 May 1919. The Navy transferred her back to the U.S. Shipping Board the same day.

References

Department of the Navy: Naval Historical Center Online Library of Selected Images: Civilian Ships: S.S. Eastern Chief (Japanese-American Freighter, 1917). Originally named Yoshida Maru # 3. Was USS Eastern Chief (ID # 3390) in 1918–1919
NavSource Online: Section Patrol Craft Photo Archive: Eastern Chief (ID 3390)

Auxiliary ships of the United States Navy
World War I cargo ships of the United States
Ships built by Uraga Dock Company
1917 ships